Surjit Kumar Jyani is an Indian politician and was ex health Minister in the Punjab Government. He has also served as Minister for Forest & Wildlife & Labour. He is member of Bharatiya Janta Party (BJP).

Early life
Jyani comes from a Hindu Jat family and his mother tongue is Bagri. His grandfather migrated from Rajasthan during English time. They own 350 acres of land in Fazilka.

Political career 
He first became a member of Punjab Vidhan Sabha from Fazilka in 1997. In 2007 and 2012, he was re-elected from Fazilka.

References

State cabinet ministers of Punjab, India
Living people
Punjab, India MLAs 1997–2002
Punjab, India MLAs 2007–2012
Punjab, India MLAs 2012–2017
Bharatiya Janata Party politicians from Punjab
People from Fazilka district
Year of birth missing (living people)